Kiryukhin may refer to:

Andrei Kiryukhin (1987–2011), Russian ice-hockey player
Nikolay Kiryukhin (1896–1953), Soviet general
Oleg Kiryukhin (born 1975), Ukrainian boxer
Oleksandr Kyryukhin (born 1974), Ukrainian footballer

Russian-language surnames